The Special Warfare Diving and Salvage or SWADS is an elite special operational unit of the Bangladesh Navy. Members are professional soldiers and are recruited through the Bangladesh Navy. The SWADS is organized, trained and equipped along the lines of SEAL/UDT teams of the United States Navy SEALs and the Republic of Korea Navy UDT/SEAL.

As of 2014, SWADS is believed to number a few hundred strong, and is based in the southern port city of Chittagong. Its base is formally known as "BNS Nirvik".

History

Although Bangladeshi Navy personnel were trained on American soil since the 1970s, United States Navy instructors were instrumental in creating SWADS in late 2008. SWADS was formally created in 2009 with 150 commandos and 200 divers recruited. US Ambassador to Bangladesh Dan Mozena provided assistance in the creation of the unit.

The unit's lineage is traced back to the Nou Commando frogmen of Sector 10 during the country's Liberation War against Pakistan. SWADS operators have participated alongside American Navy SEALs in Joint Combined Training Exchange programs under the Tiger Shark exercises.

Selection

SWADS operatives are volunteers from the Navy and are trained in Bangladesh and abroad. They do the Naval Commando Basic Course (similar to BUD/S of US Navy SEALs) from SWADS Training area at Rangamati and complete their airborne qualification course from army's School of Infantry and Tactics, Sylhet. Further specialist courses are held in various naval and army training bases in Bangladesh as well as in abroad. The average drop rate of NCB is 95%, and this is only the first step of becoming a SWADS operator. SWADS operators receive training from Republic of Korea Navy UDT/SEALs, UK's SAS & SBS, US Marine Force Recon, US Navy SEALS and Turkish SAT.

Duties

SWADS commandos are currently deployed in South Sudan as Bangladesh Force Marine Unit, part of UNMISS. They were the first SF unit to respond during Holey Artisan Bakery attack in Dhaka and later assisted the Army's 1 Para-Commando Battalion in Operation Thunderbolt, by securing the lake side and cutting of the possible escape route of the terrorists.

SWADS has also performed several Anti-Drug raids in the Bay of Bengal and captured some major drug shipments. They have also conducted Anti-Human Trafficking operations off the coast of Teknaf.

Weapons and equipment

The range of weapons and equipment used by members SWADS's is extensive. SWADS members are trained to handle all types of light & medium weapons with proficiency. Because of their close relations with US & ROK SEALs, SWADS mostly use 5.56 caliber weapons unlike other Bangladeshi SOF units.

Some of the weapons used by SWADS are:

 SIG Sauer P226
 Colt M4A1 SOPMOD
 Daewoo K2 Assault Rifle
 Daewoo K7 silenced SMG
 Norinco Type-56-2
 Knight's Armament Company SR-25
 M249 SAW
 M24 Sniper Weapon System

Besides these weapons, SWADS personnel uses Level-III & Level-IIIA bulletproof vests and ballistic helmets as standard issue. SWADS divers use various European diving and hydrographic research equipment.

References

Further reading
 
 

Special forces of Bangladesh
Military units and formations established in 2009
2009 establishments in Bangladesh
Naval special forces units and formations